Dalešice is the name of several locations in the Czech Republic:

 Dalešice (Jablonec nad Nisou District), a municipality and village in the Liberec Region
 Dalešice (Třebíč District), a market town in the Vysočina Region
 Dalešice Dam, a dam on the Jihlava river in the Vysočina Region
 Dalešice Reservoir, created by the dam
 Dalešice Hydro Power Plant a hydroelectric power plant on the Jihlava river in the Vysočina Region